Sean Terrell Hill (born August 14, 1971) is a former American football defensive back who played three seasons with the Miami Dolphins of the National Football League (NFL). He was drafted by the Dolphins in the seventh round of the 1994 NFL Draft. Hill played college football at Montana State University and attended Widefield High School in Colorado Springs, Colorado. He was also a member of the Detroit Lions. He was inducted into the Montana State University Hall of Fame as part of the class of 2016.

References

External links
Just Sports Stats
Fanbase profile

Living people
1971 births
Players of American football from Michigan
American football defensive backs
African-American players of American football
Montana State Bobcats football players
Miami Dolphins players
People from Dowagiac, Michigan
21st-century African-American sportspeople
20th-century African-American sportspeople